Charlie Pecoraro (born November 9, 1980) is an American stage, television, and film actor.

Biography
Pecoraro was born into a family of noted performers and musicians.  He is the son of jazz guitarist Charles P. Pecoraro, the nephew of Actor/Dancer/Choreographer Steven Peck, nephew of opera singer Anna Pecoraro, and grandson of classical Sicilian mandolinist/vaudevillian George Pecora.  Pecoraro grew up in Fullerton, CA where he attended Troy High School. Prior to beginning his career in acting, he graduated from the USC School of Cinematic Arts. He resides in Hollywood, California.

Career
Pecoraro is currently a series regular on an independent TV series Slacker P.I. appearing as Detective John Derringer, and has appeared in the 2009 film The Huntleigh Files and also on numerous TV shows such as Operation Repo. Furthermore, he has appeared in many TV commercials and short films. Pecoraro holds a BA in Cinema-Television from the University of Southern California. He is sometimes credited as Charles Pecoraro.

Filmography

References

External links 
 Charlie Pecoraro - Official Website
 

Living people
1980 births
USC School of Cinematic Arts alumni
American male film actors
American male television actors
American people of Italian descent